This List of Niagara University people includes alumni, faculty, presidents, and other individuals associated with Niagara University.

Founders
Bishop John Timon, C.M.
Father John J. Lynch, C.M.

Presidents
1-
2-
3-
4-Robert E. V. Rice, C.M. (1863- )
5-Patrick V. Kavanagh, C.M.
6-
7-
8-
9-Edward J. Walsh, C.M. (1908-1912) 
10-
11-
12-
13-
14-
15-
16-Francis L. Meade, C.M. (1947-1957)
17-
18-
19-Kenneth F. Slattery, C.M. (1965-1976) 
20-Gerard M. “Jerry” Mahoney, C.M. (1976-1981)
21-John G. Nugent, C.M. (1981-1984)
22-Donald J. Harrington, C.M. (1984-1989)
23-Brian J. O'Connell, C.M. (1989-1995) 
24-Paul L. Golden, C.M. (1995-2000) 
25-Joseph L. Levesque, C.M. (2000-2013)
26-James J. Maher, C.M. (2013-)

Notable alumni

Academics
Elsa Salazar Cade, award-winning science teacher and entomologist
Teresa J. Domzal, Dean of the George Mason University School of Management
Dennis Holtschneider C.M., President of DePaul University.
David M. O'Connell C.M., former president of The Catholic University of America
David Sylvester, Principal of King's University College

Arts and entertainment
Eric Gale, American jazz and session guitarist
Jim Hutton, actor noted for role in Where the Boys Are attended Niagara University, but did not graduate.   
Peter Makuck, poet, short story writer, and critic
Becky O'Donohue, American Idol contestant and Maxim (magazine) model
Jessie O'Donohue, Maxim (magazine) model
John O'Hara, noted American writer
Michele Ragusa, American actress and singer

Business
Harold C. Brown, Partner and Founder Brown & Company, LLP, Certified Public Accountants
Pasquale J. D'Amuro, Chairman and CEO of Giuliani Security and Safety
Robert Wegman, Founder, Wegmans Super Markets.
Hon. Robert W.  Hoffman, 74, 4th Judicial District, Schenectady City Court 
Liam J. Carlos, 74, CFO New York Times

Government
Kyle Andrews, Niagara County Treasurer.
Alfred F. Beiter, former U.S. Representative from New York (1933-1939, 1941-1943).
Stephen S. Blake, former New York State Assemblyman
John P. Bobo, United States Marine Corps officer; posthumously awarded the Medal of Honor for heroism in Vietnam.
Earl Brydges, former Temporary President and Majority Leader of the New York State Senate.
Thomas F. Burchill, former U.S. Representative from New York
Joseph L. Carrigg, former U.S. Representative from Pennsylvania (1951-1958).
John Katko, U.S. Representative from New York. 
Dave Levac, Canadian politician.
George Maziarz, Republican New York State Senator from Niagara County.
Kandia Milton, Convicted ex-Deputy Mayor, city of Detroit, Michigan. Pleaded guilty to accepting bribes while acting as a public official.
Leo W. O'Brien, U.S. Representative from New York State (1952-1966). 
Frank D. O'Connor, former Judge on the New York Supreme Court, Appellate Division; Member of the New York State Senate.
Gilbert Parent, past member of Canadian Parliament, served as Speaker of the Canadian House of Commons between 1994 and 2001.
Dan Schaefer, Republican U.S. Representative from Colorado (1983-1999).
Michael Scheuer, CIA analyst and author of Imperial Hubris.
Hugh B. Scott, Magistrate Judge of the U.S. District Court for the Northern District of New York; first African American to become Assistant United States Attorney.
Frederick J. Scullin, Senior Judge on the United States District Court for the Northern District of New York.
James Shanahan, U.S. Army Brigadier General; Aide to U.S. President Harry S. Truman.
Thomas J. Stapleton, Pennsylvania State Representative for the 165th district (1975-1978).

Religion
Anthony Raymond Ceresko, Old Testament scholar
Venerable Nelson Baker, Founder of the "City of Charity" in Lackawanna, NY under the patronage of Our Lady of Victory
Octavio Cisneros, Cuban American prelate of the Roman Catholic Church; Auxiliary Bishop of Brooklyn
Edmund Michael Dunne, American prelate of the Roman Catholic Church; Bishop of Peoria
Joseph Lennox Federal, American prelate of the Roman Catholic Church; Bishop of Salt Lake City
Edmund Gibbons, American prelate of the Roman Catholic Church; Bishop of Albany
Thomas Francis Lillis, American prelate of the Roman Catholic Church; Bishop of Leavenworth & Bishop of Kansas City
Blessed Michael J. McGivney, Founder of the Knights of Columbus
James Johnston Navagh, American prelate of the Roman Catholic Church; Bishop of Ogdensburg & Bishop of Paterson 
Jan Pitass, Founder of St. Stanislaus Parish in Buffalo
Donald Walter Trautman, American prelate of the Roman Catholic Church; Bishop of Erie

Sports

Baseball
Shad Barry, Major League Baseball player
Chris Begg, professional baseball player; member of Team Canada during the 2004 Summer Olympics; 2003 MAAC Pitcher of the Year
Benny Bengough, Major League Baseball player
Matt Broderick, Major League Baseball player
Harry Croft, Major League Baseball player
Jim Doyle, Major League Baseball player
Bill Friel, Major League Baseball player
Ray Keating, Major League Baseball player
Ed Lennon, Major League Baseball player
Ernie Lush, Major League Baseball player
Walt Lynch, Major League Baseball player
Sal Maglie, Major League Baseball player; two-time National League All-Star
Joe McCarthy (catcher), Major League Baseball player
Joe McCarthy (manager), Major League Baseball player and manager; National Baseball Hall of Fame and Museum member; seven-time World Series Champion
Dusty Miller, Major League Baseball player
Vince Molyneaux, Major League Baseball player
Rinty Monahan, Major League Baseball player

Basketball
Joe Arlauckas, former NBA player 
John Beilein, collegiate men's basketball head coach
Hubie Brown, Basketball Hall of Fame member; former NBA coach and TV analyst.
Al Butler, former NBA player
 T. J. Cline (born 1994), American-Israeli basketball player
Larry Costello, former NBA player and coach; six-time NBA All-Star
Charron Fisher, professional basketball player in Europe
Frank Layden, former NBA coach and executive; NBA Coach of the Year and Executive of the Year
Manny Leaks, former NBA player
Juan Mendez, MAAC Player of the Year (2004-2005); highest scoring Canadian in Division I men's basketball history.
Calvin Murphy, Basketball Hall of Fame member; three-time All-American (1968-1970); NBA All-Star (1979); and former TV analyst for the Houston Rockets.
James Reaves, former professional basketball player
Zeke Sinicola, 1st Round pick [4th overall] of the 1951 NBA Draft by the Fort Wayne Pistons.
Joe Smyth, former NBA player
 Chris Watson (born 1975), American-Israeli basketball player

Football
Dan DeSantis, former National Football League player
Bob Stefik, former professional football player

Hockey
Sean Bentivoglio, CHA Player of the Year (2006-2007); professional hockey player for the New York Islanders organization.
Justin Cross, professional hockey player
Barret Ehgoetz, professional hockey player for the Cincinnati Cyclones (ECHL)
Greg Gardner (born 1975), Canadian ice hockey player and coach
Les Reaney, professional hockey player in the Edmonton Oilers organization; CHL All-Star
Matt Ryan, former NHL player in the Los Angeles Kings organization
Joe Tallari, Hobey Baker Award finalist (2003); professional hockey player in the New York Rangers organization

References